Choqluy, also rendered as Chaghalu or Chaghlooy or Choqlu or Chuqlu or Jaghalu may refer to:
 Choqluy-e Olya
 Choqluy-e Sofla